The Cabinet of Canada has had 21 visible minorities appointed members. A visible minority is defined as "persons, other than Aboriginal people, who are non-Caucasian in race or non-white in colour".

Pierre De Bané became the first Visible Minority and Arab Canadian to hold a Cabinet position when he was appointed Minister of Supply and Services in 1978 by Prime Minister Pierre Trudeau. In 1979, Minister of Labour Lincoln Alexander became the first African Canadian appointed to the Cabinet. Hedy Fry became the first Visible Minority female cabinet member when she was appointed Minister for Status of Women and Multiculturalism in 1996. Raymond Chan became the first Chinese Canadian to hold a Cabinet Position when he was appointed Asia-Pacific Gateway Minister in 1993, while Herb Dhaliwal was the first South Asian Canadian minister, appointed Revenue Minister in 1997.

The Department of Multiculturalism has had the most Visible Minority Cabinet ministers, with four. Prime Minister Justin Trudeau has appointed a total of 11 ministers of Visible Minorities to cabinet, 7 ministers of Visible Minorities are serving in cabinet as of 2021.

J. Trudeau Cabinet (2015–current)

Harper Cabinet (2006–2015)

Martin Cabinet (2003–2006)

Chrétien Cabinet (1993–2003)

P. Trudeau Cabinet II (1980–1984)

Clark Cabinet (1979–1980)

P. Trudeau Cabinet I (1968–1979)

See also
 List of Asian-Canadian First Ministers
 List of visible minority politicians in Canada
 Cabinet of Canada

References

 
visible minority